Euxoa recussa is a moth of the family Noctuidae. The nominate form is found in mountainous areas in Southern Europe as well as the Alps. Euxoa recussa tetrastigma is found Northern Europe, east to Russia, Western Siberia, the Altai Mountains and Amur.

Description
The wingspan is 32–40 mm. Warren states E. recussa Hbn. (= telifera Donz., florigera Ev., transylvanica H-Sch.) (6 k). Forewing purplishgrey,with redbrown suffusion; claviform stigma large, blackish; orbicular and reniform brown with grey annuli; the cell black; no black streak below cell; hindwing luteous grey witli the termen dark. Generally
distributed in Europe, also found in Turkestan and Siberia.

Subspecies
Euxoa recussa recussa
Euxoa recussa tetrastigma

Biology
This moth flies from July to August depending on the location.

The larvae feed on various herbaceous plants and grasses.

References

External links
 www.lepiforum.de
  www.schmetterlinge-deutschlands.de
 Fauna Europaea

Euxoa
Moths of Europe
Moths of Asia
Moths described in 1817